The Downs is a roadstead (area of sheltered, favourable sea) in the southern North Sea near the English Channel off the east Kent coast, between the North and the South Foreland in southern England. In 1639 the Battle of the Downs took place here, when the Dutch navy destroyed a Spanish fleet which had sought refuge in neutral English waters. From the Elizabethan era onwards, the presence of the Downs helped to make Deal one of the premier ports in England, and in the 19th century, it was equipped with its own telegraph and timeball tower to enable ships to set their marine chronometers.

The anchorage has depths down to 12 fathoms (22 m). Even during southerly gales some shelter was afforded, though under this condition wrecks were not infrequent.  Storms from any direction could also drive ships onto the shore or onto the sands, which—in spite of providing the sheltered water—were constantly shifting, and not always adequately marked.
The Downs also lie between the Strait of Dover and the Thames Estuary, so both merchant ships awaiting an easterly wind to take them into the English Channel and those going up to London gathered there, often for quite long periods. According to the Deal Maritime Museum and other sources, there are records of as many as 800 sailing ships at anchor at one time.

During the First World War, German destroyers made frequent raids against ships anchored in the Downs. Royal Navy vessels of the Dover Patrol were often tasked with guarding the area at night to discourage the enemy or counterattack.

In the present day, with the English Channel still the busiest shipping lane in the world, cross-Channel ferries and other ships still seek shelter here.

Popular culture
"Black-eyed Susan" or "All in the Downs" is a song by John Gay (1685–1732). The roadstead is also mentioned in the naval song "Spanish Ladies".

References

External links
 

English Channel
Landforms of Kent
Bodies of water of England
Roadsteads of the United Kingdom